The 2000–01 Argentine Torneo Argentino A was the sixth season of third division professional football in Argentina. A total of 18 teams competed; the champion was promoted to Primera B Nacional.

Club information

Zone A

Zone B

First stage

Zone A

Zone B

Final stage

Relegation playoff

|-
!colspan="5"|Relegation/promotion playoff 1

|-
!colspan="5"|Relegation/promotion playoff 2

Huracán Corrientes remained in the Torneo Argentino A by winning the playoff.
Estudiantes (RC) was promoted to 2001–02 Torneo Argentino A by winning the playoff and General Belgrano was relegated to 2001–02 Torneo Argentino B.

See also
2000–01 in Argentine football

References

Torneo Argentino A seasons
3